Cozi Costi is an English electronic music session vocalist. She co-wrote and sang backing vocals on the song "Naughty Girl" by Australian singer Holly Valance in 2002.

Among her vocal collaborations is the song "Baby When the Light" by French DJ David Guetta. Credited to 'David Guetta featuring Cozi', "Baby When the Light" reached No. 2 in the French Singles Chart and No. 50 on the UK Singles Chart and can be found on Guetta's 2007 platinum selling album, Pop Life.

Other vocal contributions include the songs "The Storm" by Jerry Ropero and "Sensual" by PhonJaxx.

Songwriting credits include Morcheeba's "Sweet LA" Alexandra Burke's "Beating Still", Nabiha's "The Enemy", "You", "Sound of My Gun" and "Ask Yourself", Bo Bruce's "Golden", Petula Clarke "Everyword You Say" Junior Caldera's "Bang Bang" and "Just a Little Bit", Sucker DJs' "Fireworks", Alex Gaudino's "This Time" and Booty Luv's "Dance Dance".

References

External links
 

Living people
English women singers
English dance musicians
English people of Greek descent
Year of birth missing (living people)

English songwriters
English singer-songwriters